Najas halophila is an aquatic plant species native to Java, New Guinea and Queensland.

References

halophila
Aquatic plants
Flora of Java
Flora of New Guinea
Flora of Queensland
Plants described in 1988